Chaos Chaos is a 2018 studio album by the American indie-pop band Chaos Chaos. It is the third album the band has released since changing their name from Smoosh in 2012, and their first full-length since Withershins in 2010.

Background
Band members Asy and Chloe Saavedra announced on Facebook that they were working on a new album in December 2016. The band released two singles from the album on iTunes and Spotify in late 2017. "Dripping with Fire" was released on September 29, 2017, with a music video directed by Stephanie Dimiskovski released on VEVO and YouTube. "On Turning 23" was released on November 15, 2017. This video was directed by Maia Saavedra, the band members' younger sister and former collaborator. These songs and their videos carry themes about sisterhood, estrangement, and growing up.

In April 2018, the band released a music video for the album's third single, "Pink Politics," which appeared on their YouTube channel on April 12. The video was directed by Fredgy Noël and shot in public on Asy and Chloe's iPhones. Asy has said that the song was written the day after the 2016 presidential election, and that the song and video are a response to it.

Chaos Chaos began headlining their first-ever national tour on April 12 to promote the album, which was released on May 15, 2018.

On October 16, 2018, the band announced a deluxe version of the album with three new tracks, originally made available only on their Bandcamp page. It has since been made available on other platforms as well.

Track listing

References

External links

Chaos Chaos on iTunes

Chaos Chaos albums
2018 albums
Disco albums by American artists